Léo Leroy (born 14 February 2000) is a French professional footballer who plays as a midfielder for Ligue 1 club Montpellier.

Career
Leroy joined the youth academy of Rennes at the age of 8, and spent most of his football development there. On 6 February 2019, he signed his first professional contract with Châteauroux. He made his professional debut with Châteauroux in a 2–2 Ligue 2 tie with Brest on 1 March 2019.

On 28 May 2021, he signed with Montpellier.

Personal life
Leroy is the son of the French former footballer Jérôme Leroy.

References

External links
 
 

2000 births
Living people
French footballers
Footballers from Marseille
Association football midfielders
France youth international footballers
Ligue 1 players
Ligue 2 players
Championnat National 2 players
Championnat National 3 players
CS Avion players
FC Sochaux-Montbéliard players
Stade Rennais F.C. players
LB Châteauroux players
Montpellier HSC players